The following outline is provided as an overview of, and topical guide to, theology.

Theology is the systematic study of the nature of the divine. It is taught as an academic discipline, typically in universities, seminaries and schools of divinity.

Apologetics
Apologetics is the whole of the consensus of the views of those who defend a position in an argument of long standing.

Bahá'í: Bahá'í apologetics

Muslim: Muslim apologists

Conceptions of God

Divine presence
Divine presence

God

Names of God

Singular God
Absolute (philosophy)
Brahman
Emanationism
God
Logos
Supreme Being
More...

Binitarianism
Binitarianism

Trinitarianism
Trinity
Trinitarian formula
Athanasian Creed
Comma Johanneum
Consubstantiality
Homoousian
Hypostasis
Perichoresis
Shield of the Trinity
Trinitarianism in the Church Fathers
Trinitarian Universalism
More...

Other views
Aristotelian view of God
Demiurge
Divine simplicity
Egotheism
Godhead (Christianity)
Godhead (Latter Day Saints)
Great Architect of the Universe
Great Spirit
Apophatic theology
Olelbis
Open theism
Personal god
Phenomenological definition of God
Philo's view of God
Sarav viāpak
Taryenyawagon
Tian
Unmoved mover
More...

Eschatology

Eschatology, literally the "study of the last", is the part of theology and philosophy concerned with the end of the world.
Afterlife
Apocalypticism
Buddhist
Christian
Concepts of Heaven
Doomsday films
Ghost Dance Movement
Ghosts
Hindu
Islamic
Jewish
Personifications of death
Singularitarianism
Taoist
Zoroastrian
More

Existence of God

Arguments for

Arguments from
A proper basis
Beauty
Consciousness
Degree
Desire
Love
Miracles
Morality
Reason
Religious experience

Other arguments
Christological
Cosmological
Ontological
Pascal's wager
Teleological
Trademark
Transcendental
Witness
More...

Arguments against

Arguments from
Free will
Inconsistent revelations
Nonbelief
Poor design

Other arguments
God of the gaps
Incompatible-properties argument
Omnipotence paradox
Problem of evil
Problem of Hell
Theological noncognitivism
Transcendental argument for the existence of God
More...

Opposition to religion

Antireligion

Disengagement from religion
Secularism
Separation of church and state

Theism
Theism in the broadest sense is the belief in the existence of a god or gods. In the more specific sense used here theism refers to a particular doctrine concerning the nature of a God and its relationship to the universe.

Theologies

Seminaries and theological colleges

Resources
 Theological libraries and librarianship
 List of theology journals

Practitioners
Theologians

See also 

 Outline
Outlines of religions
Wikipedia outlines